Gustav Rickelt (1862–1946) was a German stage and film actor.

Selected filmography
 Earth Spirit (1923)
 The Wiskottens (1926)
 Weekend Magic (1927)
 Lemke's Widow (1928)
 Youth of the Big City (1929)
 Bobby, the Petrol Boy (1929)
 The Old Song (1930)
 Flachsmann the Educator (1930)
 Father and Son (1930)
 The Fate of Renate Langen (1931)
 Sacred Waters (1932)
 Uncle Bräsig (1936)

References

Bibliography

External links

1862 births
1946 deaths
German male stage actors
German male film actors
German male silent film actors
20th-century German male actors
Actors from Dortmund